Fairchild may refer to:

Organizations
 Fairchild Aerial Surveys, operated in cooperation with a subsidiary of Fairey Aviation Company
 Fairchild Camera and Instrument
 List of Sherman Fairchild companies, "Fairchild" companies
 Fairchild Fashion Media
 Fairchild Group, a Chinese-language media company in Canada
 Fairchild TV, a Cantonese-language television channel in Canada owned by the Fairchild Group
 Fairchild-Hiller Corporation, U.S. aviation company
 Fairchild Aircraft, an aircraft manufacturer, division of Fairchild, also variously known as Fairchild-Hiller, Fairchild-Republic and Fairchild-Dornier
 Fairchild Aircraft Ltd. (Canada), a Canadian aircraft manufacturer
 Fairchild Industries, Inc. ; U.S. aviation company, successor to Fairchild Hiller Corporation
 Fairchild Corporation, U.S. aviation company, successor to Fairchild Industries
 Fairchild Publications, Inc.
 Fairchild Recording Equipment Corporation
 Fairchild Semiconductor, an American semiconductor company
 Fairchild Systems, U.S. defense contractor
 Sherman Fairchild Foundation

People
 Fairchild (name)
 Fairchild family, descendants of Thomas Fairchild (1610–1670), English nurseryman

Places 
 Fairchild, Georgia
 Fairchild, Wisconsin, a village located within the town of Fairchild
 Fairchild (town), Wisconsin, a town that contains the village of Fairchild
 Fairchild Air Force Base, Washington state, USA
 Fairchild Beach, Heard Island, subantarctic waters
 Fairchild Glacier, Washington state, USA
 Fairchild Mountain, Colorado, USA
 Fairchild Peak, Antarctica
 Fairchild Tropical Botanic Garden, Coral Gables
 Fairchilds, Texas
 William R. Fairchild International Airport, Port Angeles, Washington state, USA

Entertainment
 FairChild (2007 videogame), a Japanese visual novel
 The Fairchild Channel F, an early video game console

Food
 Fairchild (mango), a commercial mango cultivar originating in Panama
 Fairchild tangerine

Other
 Fairchild Memorial Hall, Maxwell Air Force Base, Alabama, USA

See also 
 Fairchildren, semiconductor companies founded by people who left the Shockley Semiconductor Laboratory
 Fairchildren (album), a 2015 album
 Fairbairn
 Fairchild House (disambiguation)
 Fairchild and North-Eastern Railway
 The Fairchild Challenge, environmental outreach program
 Justice Fairchild (disambiguation)